Council Grove is a city and county seat in Morris County, Kansas, United States.  As of the 2020 census, the population of the city was 2,140.  It was named after an agreement between American settlers and the Osage Nation allowing settlers' wagon trains to pass westward through the area on the Santa Fe Trail.  Pioneers gathered at a grove of trees so that wagons could band together for their trip west.

History 

Council Grove was a stop on the Santa Fe Trail.  The first European-American settler was Seth M. Hays, who came to the area in 1847 to trade with the Kaw tribe, which had a reservation established in the area in 1846.  Hays was a great grandson of Daniel Boone.

The Main street in Council Grove is the old Santa Fe Trail. The Rawlinson-Terwilliger Home, 803 West Main Street, is the oldest stone home on the Santa Fe Trail and houses the Trail Days Cafe & Museum. 

A post office was established in Council Grove on February 26, 1855.

In 1858, the town was officially incorporated by the legislature.  Hays also opened a restaurant in 1857, the Hays House, which is said to be the oldest continuously operating restaurant west of the Mississippi River.

The town has 15 sites listed on the National Register of Historic Places.  One is the Post Office Oak.  Travelers left their mail in this designated tree to be picked up by others going in the right direction. General Custer of the United States Army slept here with his troops during the American Civil War, under a large tree known now as the Custer Elm. 
 
The National Old Trails Road, also known as the Ocean-to-Ocean Highway, was established in 1912, and was routed through Herington, Delavan, Council Grove.

In 1943, German and Italian prisoners of World War II were brought to Kansas and other Midwest states as a means of solving the labor shortage caused by American men serving in the war effort. Large internment camps were established in Kansas: Camp Concordia, Camp Funston (at Fort Riley), Camp Phillips (at Salina under Fort Riley). Fort Riley established 12 smaller branch camps, including Council Grove.

Geography
The city is fifty-five miles southwest of Topeka.

Climate
The climate in this area is characterized by hot, humid summers and generally mild to cool winters.  According to the Köppen Climate Classification system, Council Grove has a humid subtropical climate, abbreviated "Cfa" on climate maps.

Area events
 Heritage Rendezvous
 Washunga Days

Area attractions
 Allegawaho Heritage Memorial Park
 Kaw Mission State Historic Site
 1857 Hays House
 Madonna of the Trail monument
  Trail Days Historic Site
Presently, both the Council Grove Reservoir and the City Lake are popular for recreational activities.  While both lakes are open to the public and motorized boats, most of the land around the City Lake is privately owned with over three hundred lake houses.  Building is restricted on the larger Council Grove Reservoir but there are many well-positioned camp sites.  Excellent fishing is found on these lakes as well.  Walleye, crappie, white bass, and many more fish are in both the Council Grove Reservoir and the City Lake.

Demographics

2010 census
As of the census of 2010, there were 2,182 people, 991 households, and 565 families residing in the city. The racial makeup of the city was 95.8% White, 0.4% African American, 0.2% Native American, 0.2% Asian, 1.9% from other races, and 1.6% from two or more races. Hispanic or Latino of any race were 6.0% of the population.

There were 991 households, of which 26.5% had children under the age of 18 living with them, 45.5% were married couples living together, 8.3% had a female householder with no husband present, 3.2% had a male householder with no wife present, and 43.0% were non-families. 39.5% of all households were made up of individuals, and 20% had someone living alone who was 65 years of age or older. The average household size was 2.14 and the average family size was 2.85.

The median age in the city was 45.9 years. 21.7% of residents were under the age of 18; 7% were between the ages of 18 and 24; 19.8% were from 25 to 44; 27.1% were from 45 to 64; and 24.4% were 65 years of age or older. The gender makeup of the city was 46.8% male and 53.2% female.

2000 census
As of the census of 2000, there were 2,321 people, 1,002 households, and 634 families residing in the city. The racial makeup of the city was 98.23% White, 0.26% African American, 0.22% Native American, 0.22% Asian, 0.47% from other races, and 0.60% from two or more races. Hispanic or Latino of any race were 2.11% of the population.

There were 1,002 households, out of which 29.0% had children under the age of 18 living with them, 51.3% were married couples living together, 8.7% had a female householder with no husband present, and 36.7% were non-families. 34.8% of all households were made up of individuals, and 19.0% had someone living alone who was 65 years of age or older. The average household size was 2.24 and the average family size was 2.90.

In the city, the population was spread out, with 24.7% under the age of 18, 6.5% from 18 to 24, 23.8% from 25 to 44, 21.7% from 45 to 64, and 23.4% who were 65 years of age or older. The median age was 42 years. For every 100 females, there were 89.2 males. For every 100 females age 18 and over, there were 82.8 males.

The median income for a household in the city was $28,949, and the median income for a family was $37,061. Males had a median income of $29,500 versus $20,625 for females. The per capita income for the city was $20,189. About 7.4% of families and 8.5% of the population were below the poverty line, including 8.7% of those under age 18 and 15.6% of those age 65 or over.

Education

The community is served by Morris County USD 417 public school district. Council Grove High School is a high school located at 129 Hockaday St., Council Grove.  Students from the surrounding areas travel to Council Grove to attend high school. Council Grove Middle School includes grades 6 through 8 and is located at 706 E Main St.  Council Grove Elementary School includes kindergarten through the 5th grade and is attached to the middle school. The athletic teams are known as the Braves.

Transportation
Council Grove was located on the National Old Trails Road, also known as the Ocean-to-Ocean Highway, that was established in 1912.

Notable people
 Charles Curtis Vice President of the United States under Herbert Hoover 1929 - 1933, member Kaw Indian tribe.
 Don Harvey, actor
 Clara Hazelrigg, author, educator, social reformer
 James Miller, U.S. Representative from Kansas
 John Rhodes, United States House of Representatives from Arizona 1952 - 1983, House Republican Leader 1973 - 1981

Gallery
 Historic Images of Council Grove, Special Photo Collections at Wichita State University Library

See also
 National Register of Historic Places listings in Morris County, Kansas
 Council Grove Historic District
 Santa Fe Trail
 National Old Trails Road

References

Further reading

 The Story of Council Grove on the Santa Fe Trail; 2nd Ed; Lalla Maloy Brigham; 176 pages; 1921.

External links

City
 City of Council Grove
 Council Grove - Directory of Public Officials
 Council Grove Chamber of Commerce & Tourism
Historical
 , from Hatteberg's People on KAKE TV news
 Historic Images of Council Grove, Special Photo Collections at Wichita State University Library
 Kansas Photo Tour - Council Grove
 Council Grove 19th Century History
 Historical information about Council Grove
Maps
 Council Grove city map, KDOT

Cities in Kansas
County seats in Kansas
Cities in Morris County, Kansas
Native American history of Kansas
Kaw tribe
Osage Nation
Santa Fe Trail
Populated places established in 1847
1847 establishments in Indian Territory